Central American Airways was an airline based in Honduras that was founded in 2008 and ceased operations in 2011 after a crash that killed 14 people. It is not to be confused with the charter airline  and fixed-base operator of the same name that is based at Bowman Field in Louisville, Kentucky.

History
The airline was founded in March 2008, and in 2010 began flying to several different destinations within Honduras. It ceased operations on September 1, 2011.  EasySky purchased all shares of Central American Airways in 2011.

Crash of Central American Airways Flight 731
On February 14, 2011, a Let L-410 Turbolet operating Central American Airways Flight 731 crashed on approach to Toncontín International Airport, Tegucigalpa, Honduras. All 14 people aboard were killed in the accident.

References

External links
Central American Airways
Central American Airways 

Airlines established in 2008
Defunct airlines of Honduras